Kue lidah kucing (lit. 'cat tongue kue') is a small Indonesian biscuit (kue kering) shaped somewhat like a cat's tongue (long and flat). They are sweet and crunchy. This cookie is a Dutch-influenced cookie due to the historical tie between Indonesia and the Netherlands. In the Netherlands, this cookie is known as kattentong, and ultimately derived from European cat tongue biscuit.

In Indonesia, kue lidah kucing is widely known. This pastry is a special dish in some Indonesian occasion such as Eid ul-Fitr, Christmas and Chinese New Year.

See also

Cat tongue
Cookies
Cuisine of Indonesia
Kue
Ladyfinger
List of cookies
List of Indonesian dishes
List of Indonesian snacks

References

Cookies
Kue